A datestone is typically an embedded stone with the date of engraving and other information carved into it. They are not considered a very reliable source for dating a house, as instances of old houses being destroyed and rebuilt (with the old date stones intact) have been reported, or may in some cases be the date of a renovation or alteration.

Specific locations have often been chosen for datestones, viz.

corbel
gable stone
Gatepost: a large upright piece of (usually) granite, usually set at the entrance to a driveway or a field.
keystone
lintel

See also
Marriage stone
Cornerstone

References

External links
Scotland's Marriage and Date Stones
The Societe-jersiaise
An essay on datestones (mostly in London)

Archaeological artefact types
Dating methodologies in archaeology